Gideon Tinsley (April 5, 1927 – May 10, 2022) was an American Democratic Party politician in the state of Oklahoma.

Tinsley was a farmer/rancher. He was elected to the Oklahoma State Senate  in 1975 for the 22nd district and served until 1983.

References

1927 births
2022 deaths
People from El Reno, Oklahoma
Democratic Party Oklahoma state senators